Maria Cecília Marques (born May 5, 1976 in Rio de Janeiro) is a female water polo player from Brazil, who won the bronze medal with the Brazil women's national water polo team at the 2003 Pan American Games. She played in a defending role in the national squad.

References
  Profiles

1976 births
Living people
Brazilian female water polo players
Water polo players from Rio de Janeiro (city)
Commanders of the National Order of Scientific Merit (Brazil)
Pan American Games bronze medalists for Brazil
Pan American Games medalists in water polo
Water polo players at the 2003 Pan American Games
Medalists at the 2003 Pan American Games
21st-century Brazilian women